St. Alban's Episcopal Church may refer to:

 St. Alban's Episcopal Church (Bovina, Mississippi)
 St. Alban's Episcopal Church (Lidgerwood, North Dakota)
 St. Alban's Episcopal Church (Littleton, North Carolina)
 St. Alban's Episcopal Church (Los Angeles, California)
 St. Alban's Episcopal Church (Staten Island, New York)
 St. Alban's Episcopal Church (Washington, D.C.)

See also
St. Alban's Church (disambiguation)